Bolton Lake is a lake in the St. Croix River drainage basin in York County, New Brunswick, Canada.

The primary inflow is Gobbler Brook, and the primary outflow is Bolton Brook to Silas Cove on Spednic Lake, part of the St. Croix River system, which flows into Passamaquoddy Bay on the Bay of Fundy.

See also
List of lakes of New Brunswick

References

Lakes of New Brunswick
Landforms of York County, New Brunswick